Angel in the house may refer to:

 The Angel in the House, an 1854 poem by Patmore
 Angel in the House (film), another name for the 2011 British film Foster